The Cartoon Connection is an Australian children's television series aired on Seven Network in February 1985 every weekday and on weekends.

See also 
 List of Australian television series

Seven Network original programming
Australian children's television series
1985 Australian television series debuts
1990 Australian television series endings
1997 Australian television series debuts
1999 Australian television series endings
English-language television shows